Gaet'ale Pond is a small hypersaline lake located near the Dallol crater in the Danakil Depression (Afar Region, Ethiopia). It is located over a hot spring of tectonic origin and has no apparent inlet or outlet streams. The water of Gaet'ale Pond has a salinity of 43%, making it the saltiest water body on Earth.

Location and origin 

According to residents of the nearby village of Ahmed'ela, an earthquake in January 2005 reactivated a thermal spring and the pond was created.

Composition of the water 
The salts in the water of Gaet'ale Pond are mainly composed by calcium chloride at 2.72 mol/kg and magnesium chloride at 1.43 mol/kg. It also contains small amounts of Na+, K+ and NO2− ions. The total amount of dissolved solids content is 433 g/kg, or 43.3%. It also contains traces of iron(III) that form a complex with chloride, giving the water a characteristic yellow color.

Bubbles of odourless gas are emitted from the lake surface. It is likely volcanically produced carbon dioxide. Bird and insect corpses have been found around the pond, and it has been proposed that the gas may be harmful for small animals or humans.

References

External links 

 Hyperdiverse archaea near life limits at the polyextreme geothermal Dallol area

Bodies of water of Ethiopia
Afar Region
Ponds of Africa
Saline lakes of the Great Rift Valley
2008 beginnings